The Christ Church is a historic Episcopal church located at Port Republic, Calvert County, Maryland, United States. The church is a three-bay-wide, five bays long, beige stucco covered structure featuring stained glass in most of the tall paired round-arched sash windows. It is the mother Episcopal Church of Calvert County and its oldest continually worshipping congregation. Middleham Chapel was started from this congregation as a Chapel of Ease. Christ Church Parish was one of the original 30 Anglican parishes in the Province of Maryland.  Burials in the church cemetery include former U. S. Representative Thomas Parran Sr. and United States Coast Guard Admiral Merlin O'Neill.

Christ Church was listed on the National Register of Historic Places in 1975.

Gallery

References

External links

, including undated photo, at Maryland Historical Trust

Churches on the National Register of Historic Places in Maryland
Churches completed in 1772
Episcopal church buildings in Maryland
Churches in Calvert County, Maryland
18th-century Episcopal church buildings
National Register of Historic Places in Calvert County, Maryland